Hathor 25 - Coptic Calendar - Hathor 27

The twenty-sixth day of the Coptic month of Hathor, the third month of the Coptic year. On a common year, this day corresponds to November 22, of the Julian Calendar, and December 5, of the Gregorian Calendar. This day falls in the Coptic season of Peret, the season of emergence. This day falls in the Nativity Fast.

Commemorations

Saints 

 The martyrdom of Saint Valerian and Saint Tiburtius, his brother 
 The departure of Saint Gregory, the Bishop of Nyssa

References 

Days of the Coptic calendar